The following highways are numbered 839:

United States